List of ships present at the International Festival of the Sea, 2005 at H.M. Naval Base Portsmouth

Algeria
El Kirch - Djebel Chinoise-class corvette

Australia
Named in honour of the Australian-New Zealand Army Corps who fought in World War I.

Bulgaria
  - barquentine

Brazil
  - tall ship

Colombia
  - tall ship

Indonesia
  - tall ship

Denmark
 
 Georg Stage - sail training ship

France
  -  tanker
  - schooner
  - schooner
  - cutter
  - replica cutter

Germany
  -  frigate

Greece
  -  frigate

India
  -  destroyer
  - tall ship

Ireland
  - Eithne-class patrol vessel
  - brigantine

Italy
  - tall ship

Latvia

Lithuania

Netherlands
  -  amphibious transport dock
  - barque
 
  - brigantine
 Artemis
 Mercedes

Nigeria
  - Meko 360 frigate

Norway
  - tall ship

Oman
 Al Mua'zzar
  - barquentine

Pakistan

Poland
  -  frigate
 
  - barquentine

Portugal
  -  frigate
  - tall ship

Romania
  - Type 22 frigate

Russia
  -  destroyer

Serbia & Montenegro

South Africa

South Korea
 
  -  destroyer

Turkey
  -  frigate

Uruguay

United Kingdom

Royal Navy
  -  aircraft carrier
  - Ice patrol ship
  - Type 42 destroyer
  - Type 23 frigate
  -   mine countermeasures vessel
  - Type 22 frigate
  - Type 23 frigate
  -  patrol vessel
  -  mine countermeasures vessel
  - Fleet replenishment ship

Civilian
 Bessie Ellen
 Lord Nelson
 Kitty
  - tall ship
 Prince William - tall ship
  - replica of HMS Pickle topsail schooner
  - brig
 Will
  - replica Sixth-rate frigate
 
 B&Q/Castorama - Dame Ellen MacArthurs record breaking trimaran.
  - British Antarctic Survey Vessel

United States
 Pride of Baltimore II

See also
 Trafalgar 200
 International Fleet Review
 List of ships present at International Fleet Review, 2005

References
 
 International Festival of the Sea website

Trafalgar 200